The Transamerica Corporation is an American holding company for various life insurance companies and investment firms operating primarily in the United States, offering life and supplemental health insurance, investments, and retirement services. The company has major offices located in Baltimore, Maryland; Cedar Rapids, Iowa; Denver, Colorado; Norwood, Massachusetts; Exton, Pennsylvania; Harrison, New York; Johns Creek, Georgia; Plano, Texas; and St. Petersburg, Florida. Additional affiliated offices are located throughout the United States. In 1999, it became an independent subsidiary of multinational company Aegon.

Transamerica funds the Transamerica Institute, a nonprofit foundation which comprises the Transamerica Center for Retirement Studies and the Transamerica Center for Health Studies.

History 

In October 1904, A.P. Giannini founded the Bank of Italy in San Francisco. The Trans-America Corporation original headquarters was located at 4 Columbus Avenue in San Francisco. The Bank of Italy later merged with Bank of America, Los Angeles in 1928, which was then renamed Bank of America in 1930.

In March 1930, Transamerica acquired Occidental Life Insurance Company, founded in 1906. At the time, Occidental had over $25million in assets and over $150million in life insurance policies in force. Giannini said the purchase of the West Coast-based life insurance company was part of a plan for Transamerica to control every type of financial service. Following the acquisition, Occidental was renamed Transamerica Occidental Life Insurance Company. 

Over time, the company became a more diversified conglomerate that included the film distributor United Artists, Transamerica Airlines and Budget Rent a Car.

In 1972, the company completed construction of the Transamerica Pyramid skyscraper in San Francisco which served as its headquarters for many years. Although the company currently retains only a few offices in the building, the pyramid is still depicted in the company's logo and marketing materials.

In the 1980s, Transamerica began to divest and focused exclusively on financial services. It was eventually reduced to three main product divisions: insurance, investments, and retirement planning. In July 1999, Transamerica CEO Frank C. Herringer announced that Aegon, the Netherlands-based insurer, would acquire the company. Transamerica Occidental merged into Transamerica Life Insurance Company on October 1, 2008.

Products and services 
Transamerica primarily offers insurance and financial services. Types of life and health insurance policies offered include term life, whole life, universal life, variable universal life, accidental death, Medicare supplement, and long-term care. Transamerica companies also offer a variety of mutual funds and annuities. Transamerica has over 15,000 licensed insurance agents just in the state of California.

Transamerica's retirement division offers defined benefit pension plans and defined contribution retirement plans, including 401(k) and 403(b), 457, profit sharing, money purchase, cash balance, Taft-Hartley, multiple employer plans, nonqualified deferred compensation, and rollover individual retirement accounts. Other services include plan-level record keeping and administrative services, participant communications and education services, fiduciary risk mitigation services, open investment architecture, and compliance guidance and regulatory support.

In December 2020, Transamerica announced it would no longer sell variable annuities with benefit riders and fixed index annuities and is also exiting the standalone long-term care market.

Sponsorships 
Transamerica is a long-time sponsor of Cedar Rapids native and 12-time PGA Tour winner Zach Johnson. Transamerica also sponsors Kyle Stanley, 2009 Open Championship winner Stewart Cink, and Azahara Munoz, in addition to the American Junior Golf Association and its annual Transamerica Scholastic Junior All-America teams.

With a large employee presence in Denver, Transamerica in 2015 became the shirt sponsor of the Colorado Rapids, winners of the 2010 MLS Cup. Transamerica has an additional sponsorship agreement with Rapids and United States national team goalkeeper Tim Howard.

Transamerica currently collaborates with the Massachusetts Institute of Technology AgeLab, as well as the American Heart Association.

Foundations 
Transamerica funds two foundations: the Aegon Transamerica Foundation and the Transamerica Institute. It created the Aegon Transamerica Foundation in 1994 to provide financial grants to community non-profit organizations. Transamerica employees also volunteer services to these organizations. The foundation received the Corporate Citizenship Award in 2013 for creating the first urban farm in Iowa.

The Transamerica Institute consists of two divisions: the Transamerica Center for Retirement Studies and the Transamerica Center for Health Studies. The Transamerica Center for Retirement Studies researches and provides education on trends, issues, and opportunities related to saving and planning for retirement. The Transamerica Center for Health Studies focuses on identifying, researching, and analyzing health care issues facing consumers and employers. The Transamerica Institute is funded by contributions from Transamerica Life Insurance Company.

See also 

 Transamerica Pyramid
 Old Transamerica Building

References

External links 
 
 Transamerica Institute
 Transamerica Center for Retirement Services
 Transamerica Center for Health Studies
 Aegon website
 Transamerica agent directory

Holding companies of the United States
Life insurance companies of the United States
Investment companies of the United States
Companies based in Baltimore
History of San Francisco
Holding companies established in 1928
Financial services companies established in 1928
American companies established in 1928
1999 mergers and acquisitions
American subsidiaries of foreign companies
Holding companies disestablished in 1999
Defunct companies of Palau